Alcorisa is a municipality in the province of Teruel, Aragon, Spain. According to the 2018 census the municipality has a population of 3,276 inhabitants.

Alcorisa is located right by the N-211 road, 13 km to the SW of Calanda. This town is part of the Ruta del tambor y el bombo.

See also
Bajo Aragón
List of municipalities in Teruel

References

External links 

Bajo Aragón Comarca
Alcorisa site
CAI Aragón-Alcorisa 

Municipalities in the Province of Teruel
Maestrazgo